Pristerodon is an extinct genus of dicynodont therapsid from the Late Permian of South Africa, Zambia and India.

Paleobiology

Brain and senses 
Pristerodon were among the earliest land animals able to hear airborne sound as opposed to hearing via ground vibrations. A South African specimen studied with neutron tomography has shown evidence of an eardrum on its lower jaw with the implication that it was hearing impaired during the act of chewing. The specimen had a 3mm cavity for cochlea which transformed sound frequency ranges into nerve impulses sent on to the brain.

Ecology 
Pristerodon has been found in the Kundaram Formation of India, the Madumabisa Mudstone Formation of Zambia, and the Teekloof Formation of South Africa.

Gallery

See also 
 List of therapsids

References

External links 
 The main groups of non-mammalian synapsids at Mikko's Phylogeny Archive

Dicynodonts
Lopingian synapsids of Africa
Fossils of South Africa
Fossils of Zambia
Lopingian synapsids of Asia
Fossils of India
Fossil taxa described in 1868
Taxa named by Thomas Henry Huxley
Anomodont genera
Permian India